Victoria Schenk (born 21 June 1988) is an Austrian long-distance runner. In 2020, she competed in the women's half marathon at the 2020 World Athletics Half Marathon Championships held in Gdynia, Poland.

Achievements

References

External links 
 

Living people
1988 births
Place of birth missing (living people)
Austrian female long-distance runners
Austrian female marathon runners